Wilson Area High School is a four-year public high school located in Easton, Pennsylvania in the Lehigh Valley region of eastern Pennsylvania. It is the only high school in the Wilson Area School District. The high school supports the residents of Wilson, West Easton and Glendon boroughs, and Williams Township.

As of the 2021-22 school year, the school had an enrollment of 736 students, according to National Center for Education Statistics data.

The school mascot is the Warrior and its colors are blue and gold. The school superintendent announced in July 2021 that the entire school district will be using a 'W' logo instead of the feathered headdress on future purchases of uniforms and merchandise.

Athletics

The school's athletic teams belongs to PIAA's District XI and are a member of the Colonial League.

Football
Wilson's football team has been noted for its dominance in the Colonial League in the mid-2000s. It was the state title runners-up in 2005 with a final team record of 12-3. It went undefeated in 2006 and won the PIAA AA-State Championship against Jeannette Senior High School with a final record of 16-0. The Warriors won the PIAA District 11 title consecutively in 2005, 2006 and then again in 2008. They also held the Colonial League title in 1984, 1989, 2006, 2008, and 2009. Games can be spectated at Smith Field, next to the high school.

Track and field
Wilson's track and field program has been undefeated for seven years (2005-2011) with a team record of 70-0. The boys team has won the Colonial League title in 2001, 2006, 2007, 2008, 2009, 2010, and 2011.

Wrestling
The Wilson wrestling team has won Pennsylvania state titles in 2001 and 2002 and been ranked as high as 8th nationally and includes several state champions.

Mascot controversy
In July 2021, the school superintendent announced that the school district would be using a 'W' logo on future purchases of uniforms and merchandise. In August, this decision was reversed due to pushback from the community.

Activities 
The school's drama club has put on a show almost every year since 1924 and its first show was in 1912. It participates in the Freddy Awards, a local awards show organized by State Theatre for high school musicals in the Lehigh Valley.

Notable alumni
Jeff Fisher (author), High school football Journalist, Co-founder High School Football America
Dee Roscioli, Broadway singer and actress, Wicked
Dave Van Horne, former play-by-play announcer for the Miami Marlins Radio Network

References

External links
Wilson Area High School official website
Wilson Area High School athletics official website
Wilson Area High School on Facebook
Wilson Area High School athletics on Twitter
Wilson Area High School sports coverage at The Express-Times

1921 establishments in Pennsylvania
Easton, Pennsylvania
Educational institutions established in 1921
Public high schools in Pennsylvania
Schools in Northampton County, Pennsylvania